Denmark competed at the 1980 Summer Olympics in Moscow, USSR. In partial support of the American-led boycott of the 1980 Summer Olympics, Denmark competed under the Olympic Flag instead of its national flag. 58 competitors, 55 men and 3 women, took part in 30 events in 13 sports.

Medalists

Gold
Hans Kjeld Rasmussen — Shooting, Men's Skeet
Valdemar Bandolowski, Erik Hansen and Poul Richard Høj Jensen — Sailing, Men's Soling

Silver
Peter Due and Per Kjærgaard — Sailing, Men's Tornado

Bronze
Hans-Henrik Ørsted — Cycling, Men's 4.000 metres Individual Pursuit
Susanne Nielsson — Swimming, Women's 100 metres Breaststroke

Athletics

Men's 400 metres
 Jens Smedegaard Hansen

Men's Marathon
 Jorn Lauenborg
 Final — did not finish (→ no ranking)

Boxing

Men's Lightweight (– 60 kg)
Jesper Garnell
 First Round — Defeated Sylvain Rajefiarison (Madagascar) on points (5-0)
 Second Round — Lost to Galsandorj Batbileg (Mongolia) on points (1-4)

Men's Welterweight (– 67 kg)
Ole Svendsen
 First Round — Lost to Michael Pillay (Seychelles) on points (1-4)

Men's Light Heavyweight (– 81 kg)
Michael Madsen
 First Round — Defeated Csaba Kuzma (Hungary) on points (3-2)
 Second Round — Lost to Ricardo Rojas (Cuba) on points (1-4)

Canoeing

Men's Canadian Singles, 1,000 metres
Hans Christian Lassen

Cycling

Eleven cyclists represented Denmark in 1980.

Road
Individual road race
 Henning Jørgensen
 Verner Blaudzun
 Allan Jacobsen
 Per Sandahl Jørgensen

Team time trial
 Per Kærsgaard Laursen
 Michael Markussen
 Jesper Worre
 Jørgen V. Pedersen

Track
Sprint
 Henrik Salée

1000m time trial
 Bjarne Sørensen

Individual pursuit
 Hans-Henrik Ørsted

Diving

Men's Platform
Claus Thomsen

Fencing

Women's foil
Max Madsen

Handball

Men's Team Competition
Preliminary Round (Group A)
 Defeated Cuba (30-18)
 Lost to Spain (19-20)
 Lost to Poland (12-26)
 Lost to Hungary (15-16)
 Lost to East Germany (20-24)
Classification Match
 9th/10th place: Defeated Algeria (28-20) → 9th place
Team Roster
 Ole Nørskov Sørensen
 Michael Jørn Berg
 Andres Dahl-Nielsen
 Thomas Pazyj
 Bjarne Jeppesen
 Iver Grunnet
 Morten Stig Christensen
 Carsten Haurum
 Palle Jensen
 Erik Bue Pedersen
 Hans Henrik Hattesen
 Mogens Jeppesen
 Poul Kjaer Poulsen
 Per Skaarup

Rowing

Men's coxless pairs
Michael Jessen
Erik Christiansen

Men's quadruple sculls
Reiner Modest
Per Rasmussen
Morten Espersen
Ole Bloch Jensen

Women's single sculls
Lise Justesen

Sailing

Open

Shooting

Open

Swimming

Women's 100m Breaststroke
Susanne Nielsson
 Heats — 1:11.58
 Final — 1:11.16 (→  Bronze Medal)

Women's 200m Breaststroke
Susanne Nielsson
 Final — 2:32.75 (→ 4th place)

Women's 400m Individual Medley
Susanne Nielsson
 Heats — did not start (→ did not advance)

Weightlifting

Men's Light Heavyweight
Erling Johansen

Wrestling

Men's Welterweight, Greco-Roman
Kaj Jægergaard Hansen

Men's Heavyweight, Greco-Roman
Svend Erik Studsgaard

References

Nations at the 1980 Summer Olympics
1980
Summer Olympics